Andrea Pelamatti (born 9 October 2004) is a footballer who plays as a midfielder for the youth academy of Inter. Born in Italy, he is a Russia youth international.

Career

As a youth player, Pelamatti joined the youth academy of Italian Serie A side Inter.

References

External links

 

2004 births
Association football midfielders
Italian footballers
Italian people of Russian descent
Living people
Russia youth international footballers
Russian footballers